Re'john Elfong Ene (born 27 June 1999) is a Bahamian footballer who plays for Bears FC and the Bahamas national football team.

International career
In August 2013, Ene scored his side's lone goal in The Bahamas U15s 3-1 defeat to Cayman Islands U15s at the 2013 CONCACAF Under-15 Championship. Ene made his senior international debut on 7 September 2018 in a 4-0 away defeat to Belize during CONCACAF Nations League qualifying.

References

External links
 
 Profile at ESPN FC

1999 births
Living people
Bahamian footballers
Bahamas international footballers
Association football midfielders
Sportspeople from Nassau, Bahamas